An aerostructure is a component of an aircraft's airframe. This may include all or part of the fuselage, wings, or flight control surfaces. Companies that specialize in constructing these components are referred to as "aerostructures manufacturers", though many larger aerospace firms with a more diversified product portfolio also build aerostructures.

Mechanical testing of the individual components or complete structure is carried out on a Universal Testing Machine.  Test carried out include tensile, compression, flexure, fatigue, impact, compression after impact. Before testing the component, aerospace engineers build finite element models to simulate the reality.

Civilian 
Airplanes designed for civilian use are often cheaper than military aircraft. Smaller passenger airplanes are used for short distance, transcontinental transport. It is more cost efficient for airlines and there is less demand for aircraft transportation at these distances as people can, while inconvenient, drive these distances. While bigger airplanes are manufactured for intercontinental transport, so more passengers can be carried at one time, money can be saved on fuel, and airliners do not have to pay as many pilots. Cargo planes are usually built to be bigger than the average jet. They have a lot of space and large dimensions, so they can carry a lot of weight and a large volume of cargo in one trip. They have large wingspans, a very large cargo hold, and a very tall vertical fin. They are not built to accommodate passengers except for the pilots, so the use of the cargo hold is much more efficient. There does not need to be room for seats and food and bathrooms for everybody, so the companies made a design that optimizes the space in the aircraft.

Military 
The YC-14 Prototype was a prototype plane that was being designed by Boeing specifically for the US Air Force. There were a lot of different designs that were considered and different technologies that were used specifically for carrying tanks and paratroopers. There was a computer that was installed and a very powerful vertical wing that could keep the plane flying at a set altitude, so they could drop whatever they needed to in the battlefield without any complications. This allowed for precise troop placement which could be the difference between victory and defeat in a battle. It also talks about different cheaper materials for the prototype which were heavier and used a honeycomb pattern. The cheaper materials were too heavy, and the Air Force was not happy that Boeing did not meet the Air Force's expectations on the prototype even though the Air Force was aware that they would be using different materials in the production of the actual aircraft.The Apache helicopter that Boeing makes is designed so the front of the helicopter is very narrow.  Not only does it create less drag, but it is a smaller target for infantry units to hit the helicopter. They have also designed the F-15 fighter jet, which has two engines instead of one for maximum speed. This particular aircraft can reach speeds of Mach 2.5. It also happens to be the 8th fastest aircraft ever built. The Boeing C-17 Globemaster 3 uses size and a very large design to carry cargo. It has 4 powerful engines and a special T-tail designed by Boeing for precise control of the unusually large aircraft.

Research 
There is a new aircraft material that is 20% lighter than other conventional aircraft materials. However FSW aluminum-alloy which is much heavier than this new material, is more advantageous as opposed to using the new CFRP black constructions. The aluminum is more understood and can be crafted to almost exact precision as opposed to the CFRP, which is very hard to shape. The weight of the aircraft is important, but the precision of the measurements of the aircraft is also important. The new methods and testing require a wide variety of material properties, even though weight is very important when choosing a material.

Additionally, there is a new method for research, called Thermography, that uses infrared light to look at computer simulated damage to the material and the structure of an aircraft to see how it holds up. They can use this to look at materials and evaluate the integrity of the actual design of an aircraft. It is very accurate, and it will increase the development of materials as the test is much faster than traditional testing methods. It can also be used to predict the behavior of materials under certain stressful conditions that might make it fail while in use.

Examples 
 Aero Vodochody
 Alcoa's Howmet division
 Collins Aerospace, currently a subsidiary of Raytheon Technologies
 GKN
 Goodrich Aerostructures Group, currently a part of Collins Aerospace
 Mitsubishi Heavy Industries Aerospace
 Messier-Bugatti-Dowty
 Indonesian Aerospace
 Premium AEROTEC
 Exelis Inc.
 Groupe Latécoère
 Spirit AeroSystems
 Stelia Aerospace
 Vought

References

Aerospace engineering